The 2023 USA Cross Country Championships will be the 132nd edition of the USA Cross Country Championships. The USA Cross Country Championships will take place at Pole Green Park in Richmond, Virginia, on 21 January 2023 and will serve as the US Trials for 44th edition of 2023 World Athletics Cross Country Championships (6 member teams) in Bathurst, Australia on 18 February 2023.

Results 
Race results

Men

Women

U-20 Men

U-20 Women

External links
USA Cross Country home page
2023 USA Cross Country results

References

2023
USA Cross Country Championships
USA Cross Country Championships
USA Cross Country Championships
USA Cross Country Championships
Sports competitions in Virginia